Kerr Drug was an American chain of 76 drug stores throughout North Carolina. Its headquarters were located in Raleigh, North Carolina. On September 10, 2013, Walgreens announced its purchase of Kerr.

History

The company was founded in Raleigh by Banks Kerr in 1951.  The chain was operating 97 stores when it was acquired in 1995 by JCPenney. In 1996, when JCPenney attempted to purchase Eckerd Drug, the FTC forced JCPenney to divest itself of 34 former Kerr Drug stores and 130 Rite Aid stores.  These stores were ultimately purchased by a group led by former Thrift Drug executives led by Anthony Civello who became Kerr Drug's President & CEO who left the JC Penney organization following the Eckerd acquisition.

In 2013, Walgreens purchased the remaining Kerr Drug stores and its distribution center.

References

External links
Kerr Drug Online

Health care companies based in North Carolina
Defunct companies based in North Carolina
Defunct pharmacies of the United States
Companies based in Raleigh, North Carolina
Retail companies established in 1951
Retail companies disestablished in 2013
1951 establishments in North Carolina
2013 disestablishments in North Carolina
2013 mergers and acquisitions
Walgreens Boots Alliance